Center Point is an unincorporated community in Carroll County, in the U.S. state of Georgia.

History
The name is sometimes spelled "Centerpoint". Center Point was named from its relatively central location between Carrollton and Villa Rica.

References

Unincorporated communities in Carroll County, Georgia
Unincorporated communities in Georgia (U.S. state)